Big Creek Bridge may refer to:

 Big Creek Bridge (California)
 Big Creek Bridge (Madrid, Iowa)
 Big Creek Bridge 2 in Iowa
 Big Creek Bridge (Oregon)